Acacia cracentis is a shrub belonging to the genus Acacia and the subgenus Juliflorae that is endemic to south western Australia.

Description
The branchlets are sericeous between the resinous ribs particularly at the extremities. Like most species of Acacia it has phyllodes rather than true leaves. It blooms from July to September producing yellow flowers. The simple inflorescences are usually solitary with sessile flower-heads that has a spherical or near sperical shape and a diameter of  containing 12 to 20 flower golden coloured flowers. The seed pods that form after flowering are erect with a linear shape but are marginally raised over and constricted between each of the seeds. The glossy mottled seeds are longitudinally arranged inside the pods.

Distribution
It is native to a small area of the Wheatbelt region of Western Australia where it has a scattered distribution from around the Chiddarcooping Nature Reserve in the north down to around Hyden the south over a distance of about  where it is often situated among and around granite outcrops growing in gravelly loam soils as a part of Melaleuca shrubland or low heath communities and is also associated with Eucalyptus stowardii and species of Casuarina.

See also
List of Acacia species

References

cracentis
Acacias of Western Australia
Plants described in 1999
Taxa named by Bruce Maslin